Margaret Beveridge Stevenson (1865–1941) was a New Zealand Bahai. She was born in Onehunga, Auckland, New Zealand in 1865. She was buried at Hillsborough Cemetery.

References

1865 births
1941 deaths
People from Auckland
New Zealand Bahá'ís
Burials at Hillsborough Cemetery, Auckland